The reticulated toadfish (Sanopus reticulatus) is a species of fish in the family Batrachoididae endemic to Yucatan.

References

Sanopus
Fish of Central America
Vertebrates of Belize
Endemic fauna of Belize
Fish described in 1983
Taxonomy articles created by Polbot